William Hepburn may refer to:
 William Peters Hepburn, American Civil War officer and congressman from Iowa
 William Rickart Hepburn, Scottish politician and soldier